Fox UFC Fight Night  (previously referred as Fox UFC Saturday for broadcasts on Fox or FS1 UFC Fight Night for broadcasts on other Fox-owned properties) was the branding used for telecasts of mixed martial art competitions from the Ultimate Fighting Championship (UFC) that were produced by Fox Sports. Previously, UFC on Fox was also used as a blanket title for UFC events aired on the Fox network, although since the concurrent launch of Fox Sports 1 and rebranding of Fuel TV as Fox Sports 2 in August 2013, all live UFC broadcasts on Fox-owned networks (including preliminaries, UFC Fight Night and The Ultimate Fighter Finale) have since used the name.

History

On August 18, 2011, the Ultimate Fighting Championship reached a seven-year broadcast agreement with Fox Sports, giving it the rights to televise matches sanctioned by the promotion through 2018, ending the UFC's relationship with cable channel Spike. Through the agreement, Fox Sports will air four live events per year in either prime time or late night, as well as other UFC programming (including UFC Fight Night, Road to the Octagon and The Ultimate Fighter) on its various broadcast and cable properties, including on Fox, FX and Fuel TV. The deal was significant as it marked the first time that the UFC would televise its events on terrestrial television in the United States.

Incidentally, MyNetworkTV (a sister network-turned-programming service of the Fox broadcast network) previously carried events from the International Fight League, then a competitor to the UFC, from September to November 2007 under a time-buy arrangement until the UFC purchased that promotion (MyNetworkTV is not included in Fox Sports' UFC agreement). The first UFC event to air as part of the agreement was a title card between Junior dos Santos and Cain Velasquez, which aired on Fox on November 12, 2011.

The broadcast partnership between Fox and the UFC ended at the conclusion of 2018 as the promotion signed a new broadcast deal with ESPN that began in January 2019.

Commentators

On-air staff
 Jon Anik – commentator (2012–2018)
 Karyn Bryant – reporter (2013–2018)
 Joe Buck – studio host (2011)
 Daniel Cormier – analyst/commentator (2014–2018)
 Dominick Cruz – analyst/commentator (2014–2018)
 Nicole Dabeau – studio host/reporter (2012–2013)
 Brendan Fitzgerald – commentator (2017–2018)
 Kenny Florian – studio host/analyst (2012–2018)
 Jay Glazer – studio host (2011–2013)
 Mike Goldberg – commentator (2011-2016)
 Ariel Helwani – reporter (2014–2016)
 Curt Menefee – studio host (2012–2018)
 Joe Rogan – commentator (2011–2018)
 Jimmy Smith – analyst/commentator (2018)
 Brian Stann – analyst (2012–2017)

Broadcast history
All matches listed are for those broadcast on the Fox network.

References

 
MundoMax original programming
Fox Sports 1 original programming
FX Networks original programming
2011 American television series debuts
2018 American television series endings